Kitchen Sink is the fourth studio album by English musician Nadine Shah. It was released on 26 June 2020 under Infectious Music.

Singles
On 4 February, Shah announced the release of her new album - originally scheduled for 5 June 2020 - along with the first single "Ladies for Babies (Goats for Love)".

On 25 March 2020, the second single "Trad" was released.

The third release "Buckfast" was released on 13 May 2020, along with the announcement the album had been pushed back to June 26, from its original date of June 5. Shah said of the single: "'Buckfast' is about a toxic relationship, it's about gaslighting."

Critical reception
Kitchen Sink was met with "universal acclaim" reviews from critics. At Metacritic, which assigns a weighted average rating out of 100 to reviews from mainstream publications, this release received an average score of 86, based on 14 reviews.

Track listing

Personnel

Musicians
 Nadine Shah – Lead vocals 
 Ben Nicholls – bass guitar 
 Neil MacColl – vocals 
 Pete Wareham – saxophone , flute 

Production
 Ben Hillier – producer , drums , engineer , guitar , percussion 
 Dan Crook – engineer 
 Katie Tavini – mastering engineer 
 Maisie Cook – engineer

Charts

References

2020 albums
Nadine Shah albums
Infectious Music albums
Albums produced by Ben Hillier